Plasmodium minuoviride is a parasite of the genus Plasmodium.

Like all Plasmodium species P. minuoviride has both vertebrate and insect hosts. The vertebrate hosts for this parasite are reptiles.

Description 

The parasite was first described by Perkins and Austin in 2008.

The name is derived from the Latin "to draw green blood". The host species Prasinohaema prehensicauda has green blood.

Geographical occurrence 

This species is found in New Guinea.

Hosts

This species infects the skink Prasinohaema prehensicauda.

References 

minuoviride